Metasphenisca caeca is a species of tephritid or fruit flies in the genus Metasphenisca of the family Tephritidae.

Distribution
Eritrea.

References

Tephritinae
Taxa named by Mario Bezzi
Insects described in 1908
Diptera of Africa